The People's Will Party is a political party in Syria.

History 

In 2000, shortly after the convention of the 9th Congress of the Syrian Communist Party, 80% of the membership of Damascus organization of the party were expelled. As this illegitimate procedure was widened to cover more party organizations all over Syria, the affected comrades and party organizations formed the National Committee for the Unity of the Syrian Communists, which re-published the Kassioun newspaper. The new party is not affiliated with the National Progressive Front, which brought together the ruling Ba'ath Party and other legal parties.

In 2012, the communist group formed an officially registered party known as the People's Will Party that convened its 10th Periodical, 1st after registration, Congress in June 2013. The party ran independent candidates in the parliamentary elections in 2003 and 2007 but failed to win any seats. Nonetheless, in the parliamentary elections of 2012, the Popular Front for Change and Liberation, a coalition formed by the PWP, took 5 seats. The Party joined the demonstrations at the start of the 2011 Syrian Crisis, and a number of its activists in Damascus, Homs and Deir ez-Zur were killed by the governmental police and other services, while others were detained or arrested in other Syrian governorates. As the Syrian popular movement turned armed and violent, the PWP continued with its humanitarian aids and mediation efforts in some conflict zones. The PWP seeks a comprehensive, radical and democratic change of the regime as a whole, not only the removal of the president. Economically, the party supports a reversal of liberalization reforms that started in 2005 and laid the foundation for the social and political unrest in Syria. It supports the creation of a strong national economy.

Dr. Kadri Jamil, one of PWP Council Secretaries, was a member of the committee that drafted amendments to the Constitution of Syria in response to the 2011 Syrian protests. The amendments were approved in the Syrian constitutional referendum in 2012 and allowed multiparty elections in Syria.

Leadership 

In organization, the People's Will Party follows democratic centralism. Nonetheless, it has no assignment for a secretary general; instead, a collective leadership of the members of the Central Council that are elected in the General Conference rules the party. The Central Council elects its members of the Syrian Presidium and members of the Secretariat to undertake daily tasks.

Parliamentary elections

References

External links
Website of the People's Will Party's newspaper Kassioun (Arabic and English)

2012 establishments in Syria
Communist parties in Syria
Political parties established in 2012
Political parties in Syria